Southworth is a surname. Notable people with the surname include:

Albert Southworth (1811–1894), co-proprietor of Southworth & Hawes studio
Azariah Southworth (born 1987), American music producer and broadcaster
Bill Southworth (born 1946), American baseball player
Billy Southworth (1893–1969), American baseball player and manager
Billy Southworth Jr. (1917–1945), American baseball player and bomber pilot
Bobby Southworth (born 1969), American mixed martial arts fighter
Dorothy Fay Southworth (1915–2003), American actress also known as Dorothy Fay
E. D. E. N. Southworth (1819–1899), American writer
Effie A. Southworth (1860–1947), American botanist and plant pathologist
George Clark Southworth (1890–1972), American radio engineer discoverer of waveguides
Gilbert de Southworth (b. 1270), architect of Samlesbury Hall
Helen Southworth (born 1956), United Kingdom politician
John Southworth (martyr) (1592–1654), English Catholic martyr
John Southworth (musician) (born 1972), Canadian pop singer-songwriter
Lucinda Southworth, wife of Google co-founder Larry Page

Fictional characters:
Miss Ellie Ewing Farlow, née Southworth, character in the American television series Dallas